"Egomania" was the first episode of a three-part documentary series on Channel 4 made by Firecracker Films about people who are diagnosed with narcissistic personality disorder (NPD). The other two parts of the series, called Mania, were called "Pyromania" and "Erotomania". The film was directed by Mark Soldinger and narrated by actor Bernard Hill.

The film was not well received by some critics. Sam Wollaston from The Guardian referred to it as "an excuse to show some really nasty people and their behaviour on the television". Though he does feel the documentary improves towards the end: "When a contributor who has featured throughout, Sam Vaknin, reveals that he is a sufferer. And then we get to see him in action, the out-takes of the making of the film ... swaggers around Camden Market in London, shouting at people, demanding money, as if he owns the place. Well, he does, so maybe it's OK." However, Wollaston notes: "And anyway, Frank only displays three of the nine symptoms of narcissistic personality disorder (NPD), so he's not even a proper egomaniac."

References

External links 
 
Egomania on Channel 4 website
Egomania on website of its production company, Firecracker Films

British television films
Channel 4 documentary series
Works about narcissism